Delijan (also Romanized as Delījān) is a village in Siyarastaq Yeylaq Rural District, Rahimabad District, Rudsar County, Gilan Province, Iran. At the time of the 2006 census, its population was 55 spread across 22 families.

References 

Populated places in Rudsar County